Dr. Olcese served as the rector of "La Universidad Agraria La Molina" from 1966 to 1968.

His Board was as follows:
Vice-Presidente: Guillermo Gómez
Vocal Economía: Dante Rocca Pereyra
Vocal Actas: Alfonso Chirinos Almanza
Vocal Cultura: José Ducato Backus
Vocal RR.PP.: Alberto Ordóñez
Vocal Act. Soc. y Asistencia Social: Alfredo Montes

He served as the Head of the Capital Development Fund, a U.N. banking institution.
He also cofounded, and still actively participates in the I.P.C (International Potato Center) Organization.

External links

Peruvian scientists